Linopyrga is a small genus of very small sea snails, pyramidellid gastropod mollusks or micromollusks. This genus is currently placed in the subfamily Chrysallidinae of the family Odostomiidae.

Shell description
The original description of the genus can be found at:

Life history
Nothing is known about the biology of the members of this genus. As is true of most members of the Pyramidellidae sensu lato, they are (were) most likely ectoparasites.

Species
Species within the genus Linopyrga include:
 Linopyrga australis (Thiele, 1930)
 Linopyrga bisculpta Laseron, 1951
 Linopyrga brevis (Pritchard, 1900)
 Linopyrga ceria Laseron, 1951
 Linopyrga fannyae (Saurin, 1959)
 Linopyrga feriarum (Saurin, 1959)
 Linopyrga fornix Laseron, 1951
 † Linopyrga junior Laws, 1941
 Linopyrga lineata (Saurin, 1959)
 Linopyrga nugatoria (Hedley, 1903)
 Linopyrga ovalis (de Folin & Perier, 1875)
 Linopyrga pascoei (Angas, 1867)
 Linopyrga pegma (Laseron, 1951)
 Linopyrga perscalata (Hedley, 1909)
 Linopyrga portseaensis (Gatliff & Gabriel, 1911)
 Linopyrga primitractus (Saurin, 1959)
 † Linopyrga pseudorugata (Marshall & Murdoch)
 Linopyrga pulchra (Garrett, 1873)
 Linopyrga punctigera (A. Adams, 1860)
 Linopyrga rugata (Hutton, 1886) (Type species) as Odostomia rugata
 Linopyrga reticulata Laseron, 1959
 Linopyrga rugata (Hutton, 1886)
 Linopyrga sanguis Laws, 1941
 Linopyrga sinus (Saurin, 1959)
 Linopyrga tantilla (A, Adams, 1863)

References

External links 
 Linopyrga rugata illustration of type species
 Laws C.R. (1941) Review of the Tertiary and Recent Neozelanic Pyramidellid Molluscs. Nº 8. The pyrgulinid genera and the genus Evalea. Transactions and Proceedings of the Royal Society of New Zealand, 71: 6-22, pl. 1-2

Pyramidellidae
Gastropods of New Zealand